"U-Turn" is a song by American singer-songwriter Usher, released as the fourth international single from his third studio album, 8701 (2001), on March 11, 2002. The song was produced by Jermaine Dupri and was a departure from the previous two ballads that had been released from the album. The track reached the top 10 in Australia, the top 20 in the UK and Switzerland and was a top 40 hit in the Netherlands. The single was not released in the US.

The song was written by Usher, Dupri and Brian Michael Cox who co-wrote four songs on the album including hit single "U Got It Bad". The song also references Michael Jackson and Bobby Brown and also refers to the crunk style of rap making it one of the first mainstream R&B tracks to refer to that style.

Track listings
UK CD
 "U-Turn" (Album Version)
 "U-Turn" (The Almighty Mix) 
 "U-Turn" (The Almighty Dub) 
 "U-Turn" (Video - Plus 'Behind The Scenes' Footage)

Europe Maxi-CD
 U-Turn [Album Version] 3:12
 U-Turn [The Almighty Mix] 7:22
 U-Turn [The Almighty Dub] 7:24
 U R The One 3:56
 Video U-Turn 3:05

Germany CD
 U-Turn (Album Version) 3:12
 U-Turn (The Almighty Mix) 7:22

Charts

Release history

References

 NME U-Turn review
 [ Allmusic.com 8701 article]

Usher (musician) songs
2001 songs
2002 singles
Arista Records singles
Songs about dancing
Songs about nostalgia
Song recordings produced by Jermaine Dupri
Songs written by Bryan-Michael Cox
Songs written by Jermaine Dupri
Songs written by Usher (musician)